The Thai League Cup is a knock-out football tournament played in Thai sport. Some games are played as a single match, others are played as two-legged contests. The 2014 Thai League Cup kicked off on   1 February 2014 with the Bangkok & field regional qualifiers. The Thai League Cup has been readmitted back into Thai football after a 10-year absence. The Thai League Cup is sponsored by Toyota thus naming it Toyota League Cup. The prize money for this prestigious award is said to be around 5 million baht and the runners-up will be netting 1 million baht.

The prize money is not the only benefit of this cup, the team winning the fair play spot will get a Hilux Vigo. The MVP of the competition will get a Toyota Camry Hybrid Car. The winner of the cup will earn the right to participate on a cup competition in Japan.

This is the first edition of the competition and the qualifying round will be played in regions featuring clubs from the Regional League Division 2.

Calendar

1st round

Final

2014 in Thai football cups
Thailand League Cup
2014
2014